is a rose, human and Godzilla hybrid kaiju who first appeared in Toho's 1989 film Godzilla vs. Biollante, and has since appeared in numerous licensed video games and comic books. The creature is portrayed as a genetically engineered clone of Godzilla spliced with the genes of a rose and a human. As the character was created during the end of the Cold War and a wane in the concerns over nuclear weapons represented by Godzilla, Biollante was conceived as a symbol of more contemporary controversies regarding genetic engineering.

Overview
Biollante first appears in the 1989 film Godzilla vs. Biollante. After Godzilla's return in 1985, Dr. Genshiro Shiragami attempts to use the monster's cells to genetically enhance various species of plants to create crops resistant to harsh weather of Saradia, an arid country in the Middle East. His attempts are initially thwarted when a bomb planted by the American organisation Bio-Major destroys his laboratory and kills his daughter Erika. Shiragami splices her DNA with that of a rose, which is nearly destroyed five years later by an earthquake. Hoping to make the rose immortal, he further splices its DNA with those of Godzilla, resulting in the creation of a hybrid mutant he christens Biollante. The creature breaks out of the lab and into Lake Ashi, where it begins calling out to its progenitor Godzilla. Godzilla arrives and incinerates Biollante, whose spores float into the atmosphere. The spores later land near Osaka in the form of a much more Godzilla-like Biollante, who fights Godzilla to a standstill until the latter retreats after being weakened by the Anti-Nuclear Energy Bacteria. Biollante subsequently transforms into spores again and floats into space, with an image of Erika being seen among the spores.

The creature makes a brief cameo appearance in Godzilla vs. SpaceGodzilla, where it is speculated that its cells floating in space may have contributed to the creation of the monster SpaceGodzilla.

In Godzilla: Monster Apocalypse, a prequel novel to Godzilla: Planet of the Monsters, Biollante emerged off the coast of Normandy and battled against the Far East Union's amphibious warfare force. Two Moguera prototypes, each loaded with explosives were deployed to Normandy and engaged Biollante in battle. Biollante manages to destroy one of the two machines, but is eventually defeated when the remaining Moguera drilled into the nucleus in its root cavity. 

In the web series Godziban, a Biollante named Sakuya is the protector of an ancient forest threatened by Desghidorah. One of her seedlings, a dryad-like character named Erika, ends up on Godzilla-kun's island and recruits him, Little Godzilla, and Minilla to help fight the three headed dragon.

Development

Biollante was first conceived by dentist Shinichiro Kobayashi, who was the winner of a story writing contest for a sequel to The Return of Godzilla. In developing the character, Kobayashi kept in mind how he would feel if his daughter died, and combined this with a mental image he had consisting of Godzilla being consumed by a flower. His idea of Biollante's origins was not too different from those of the final film, though the creature was portrayed in his submission as having no direct link to Godzilla, and of having human-level intelligence, as well as maintaining the memories of Erika. The draft's portrayal of the character had her psychically communicating with a reporter via images of flowers with human faces, and the final Biollante creature had a woman's face. Kobayashi had previously created a plant-animal hybrid kaiju named Leogon for a similar story writing contest held for 1971's Return of Ultraman series.

Koichi Kawakita, who had previously worked for Tsuburaya Productions, was assigned to designing and realizing Biollante by Toho after the company became impressed at his work in Gunhed. Kawakita made use of Gunhed'''s special effects team Studio OX, though designing and building the Biollante props proved problematic, as traditional suitmation techniques made realizing the requested design of the creature's first form difficult, and the resulting cumbersome model for Biollante's final form was met with disbelief from the special effects team. Biollante's first form was performed by Masao Takegami, who sat within the model's trunk area on a platform just above water level. While the creature's head movements were simple to operate, its vines were controlled by an intricate array of overhead wires which proved difficult for Godzilla performer Kenpachiro Satsuma to react to during combat scenes as they offered no tension, thus warranting Satsuma to feign receiving blows from them, despite not being able to perceive them. Creature designer Shinji Nishikawa originally designed Biollante's head as much more flowerlike, with four petal-like jaws, though the film's producers insisted on a more reptilian head. Biollante's final form proved even more difficult to operate than the previous model, as its vine network took hours to rig up on set and required 32 wires to operate, far more than required to operate King Ghidorah in the following film. Visibility in the final form Biollante suit was poor, thus causing difficulties for Takegami in aiming the creature's head when firing sap, which permanently stained anything it landed on.

Appearances

Films
 Godzilla vs. Biollante (1989)
 Godzilla vs. SpaceGodzilla (1994 – stock footage cameo)

Video games
 Super Godzilla (SNES – 1993)
 Godzilla: Kaijū Daikessen (SNES - 1994)
 Godzilla Trading Battle (PlayStation – 1998)
 Godzilla: Save the Earth (Xbox, PS2 – 2004)
 Godzilla: Unleashed (Wii – 2007)
 Godzilla: The Game (PS3, PS4 – 2014)
 Godzilla Defense Force (2019)
 Magic: The Gathering Arena - Biollante, Plant Beast Form / Nethroi, Apex of Death (2020)

LiteratureGodzilla at World’s End (1998)
 Godzilla: Rulers of Earth (comic – 2013–2015)
 Godzilla: Cataclysm (comic – 2014)
 Godzilla: Oblivion'' (comic – 2016)

See also
List of fictional plants

References

Film characters introduced in 1989
Godzilla characters
Fictional plants
Toho monsters
Fictional characters with superhuman strength
Fictional hybrids
Fictional human hybrids
Fictional hybrid life forms
Fictional monsters
Fictional mutants
Fictional genetically engineered characters
Fictional mass murderers
Kaiju
Science fiction film characters
Horror film villains
Female horror film villains